ABS-CBN is one of the largest television networks in the Philippines.

ABS-CBN may also refer to:

 ABS-CBN Corporation, the parent company of the television network
 List of assets owned by ABS-CBN Corporation, other subsidiaries and assets of ABS-CBN Corporation which may or have had carried "ABS-CBN" as part of their names
 List of ABS-CBN Corporation channels and stations, television channels which carry "ABS-CBN" as part of their branding names

See also